Sinkovitz is a Slavic-originated surname. Notable people with the surname include:

 Frank Sinkovitz (1923–1989), American football player

See also
 Sinković
 Imre Sinkovits (1928–2001), Hungarian actor

Slavic-language surnames